Roger Pillath was a player in the National Football League for the Los Angeles Rams and Pittsburgh Steelers in 1965 and 1966 as a tackle. He played at the collegiate level at the University of Wisconsin–Madison.

Biography
Pillath was born Roger Allan Pillath on December 21, 1941 in Marinette, Wisconsin.

See also
List of Pittsburgh Steelers players

References

Los Angeles Rams players
Pittsburgh Steelers players
Wisconsin Badgers football players
People from Marinette, Wisconsin
Players of American football from Wisconsin
1941 births
Living people